Grazing Dreams is the second album by American sitarist and composer Collin Walcott. It was recorded in 1977 and released on the ECM label later that year.

Reception

The AllMusic review by Michael G. Nastos awarded the album 4½ stars. Writing for All About Jazz, John Kelman called the album "a truly deep recording that makes Walcott's death in a car accident while on tour with Oregon... all the more tragic", and noted that Walcott was "truly one of the earliest musicians to explore the integration of music from other cultures into an improvised jazz setting." The authors of the Penguin Guide to Jazz Recordings stated: "The quartet format... inevitably anticipates Walcott's and Cherry's work with Codona, and the long 'Song of the Morrow' is a perfect encapsulation of the group's idiom."

In an article at Between Sound and Space, Tyran Grillo wrote: "Grazing Dreams is structured as long-form whole in which individual tracks blend into the overarching power that binds them," and commented: "The engineering of this album is ahead of its time. Considering the way each track evolves, an attuned sensibility was clearly required to bring out the music's full breadth. Case in point: the way the buzzing solitude that opens 'Gold Sun' gradually develops into a honeyed elaboration of sitar and bass is nothing short of astonishing. Each tune is spun from the same cloth, dyed in real time with the languid syncopation of improvisers who feel what they hear. Gentility through strength is the backbone of Grazing Dreams, a poignant and timeless statement spun from the ether of dreams."

Track listing
All compositions by Collin Walcott except as indicated
 "Song Of The Morrow" - 9:15   
 "Gold Sun" (Don Cherry, Collin Walcott) - 7:03
 "The Swarm" - 6:09
 "Mountain Morning" - 1:58
 "Jewel Ornament" (Don Cherry, John Abercrombie, Collin Walcott) - 5:04
 "Grazing Dreams" - 6:53  
 "Samba Tala" (Dom Um Romão, Collin Walcott) - 1:30   
 "Moon Lake" - 8:27

Personnel
Collin Walcott — sitar, tabla
Don Cherry — trumpet, wood flute, doussn' gouni
John Abercrombie — guitar, electric mandolin
Palle Danielsson — bass
Dom Um Romão — percussion, tambourine, berimbau

References

ECM Records albums
Collin Walcott albums
1977 albums
Albums produced by Manfred Eicher